Chlorophyllum molybdites, which has the common names of false parasol, green-spored Lepiota and vomiter, is a widespread mushroom. Poisonous and producing severe gastrointestinal symptoms of vomiting and diarrhea, it is commonly conflated with the shaggy parasol (Chlorophyllum rhacodes) or shaggy mane (Coprinus comatus), and is the most commonly misidentified poisonous mushroom in North America. Its large size and similarity to the edible parasol mushroom (Macrolepiota procera), as well as its habit of growing in areas near human habitation, are reasons cited for this. The nature of the poisoning is predominantly gastrointestinal.

Description
It is an imposing mushroom with a pileus (cap) ranging from 8 to 30 cm in diameter, hemispherical and with a flattened top. The cap is whitish in colour with coarse brownish scales. The gills are free and white, usually turning dark and green with maturity. It has a rare green spore print. The stipe ranges from 5 to 30 cm tall and bears a double-edged ring. This mushroom lacks the snakeskin pattern that is generally present on the parasol mushroom. Flesh thick, firm at first, soft with age, white, unchanging or sporadically becoming reddish-brown to pale reddish-pink, almost orange in the base of the foot when cut or crushed.

Distribution and habitat
Chlorophyllum molybdites grows in lawns and parks across eastern North America and California, as well as temperate and subtropical regions around the world. Fruiting bodies generally appear after summer and autumn rains. It appears to have spread to other countries, with reports from Scotland, Australia, and Cyprus.

Toxicity
Chlorophyllum molybdites is the most frequently eaten poisonous mushroom in North America. The symptoms are predominantly gastrointestinal in nature, with vomiting, diarrhea and colic, often severe, occurring 1–3 hours after consumption. Although these poisonings can be severe, particularly in children, none have yet resulted in death.

Professor James Kimbrough writes:Chlorophyllum molybdites, the green-spored Morgan's Lepiota, is responsible for the greatest number of cases of mushroom poisonings in North America, and in Florida. This is probably due to the fact that it is easily confused with choice edible species such as Lepiota procera and L. rhacodes, and it is one of the most common mushrooms found on lawns and pastures throughout the country, with the exception of the Pacific Northwest. When eaten raw C. molybdites produce severe symptoms, including bloody stools, within a couple of hours. When cooked well, or parboiled and decanting the liquid before cooking, others eat and enjoy it. Eilers and Nelso (1974) found a heat-labile, high molecular weight protein which showed an adverse effect when given by intraperitoneal injection into laboratory animals.

Gallery

References

External links

Mushroom Expert – Chlorophyllum molybdites
Tom Volk's Fungus of the Month – Chlorophyllim molybdites
Your Yard Might Be Home to the "Vomiter" Mushroom | Huffington Post

Poisonous fungi
Agaricaceae
Fungi found in fairy rings
Fungi of Europe
Fungi of North America
Fungi of Africa